The 1963–64 Football League Cup was the fourth season of the Football League Cup, a knockout competition for England's top 92 football clubs; only 82 of them took part. The competition began on 4 September 1963 and ended with the two-legged final on 15 and 22 April 1964.

Match dates and results were initially drawn from Soccerbase, and they were later checked against Rothmans Football Yearbook 1970–71.

Calendar
Of the 82 teams, 46 received a bye to the second round and the other 36 played in the first round; these were the teams ranked 57th–92nd in the 1962–63 Football League. Semi-finals and final were two-legged.

First round

Ties

Replays

Second round

Ties

Replays

2nd Replays

Third round

Ties

Replays

Fourth round

Ties

Replay

Fifth round

Ties

Replay

Semi-finals

First Leg

Second Leg

Final 

Leicester City win 4–3 on aggregate.

References

General

Specific 
									
									
									
									
									

1963–64
England
League
Cup